Extended Play is a 1982 short film written and directed by David Casci.  The film was shot at the Sunnyvale Town Center mall.

Plot
Extended Play is about the adventures of a teenager out for a summer day of fun at a shopping mall video game arcade unlike any other.

References

External links

1982 films
1982 comedy films
1982 short films
American comedy short films
1980s English-language films
1980s American films